DeShields is a surname.  Notable people with the name include:

Delino DeShields (born 1969), American baseball coach and former player
Delino DeShields Jr. (born 1992), American baseball player
Diamond DeShields (born 1995), American basketball player
Keron DeShields (born 1992), American basketball player

See also
André De Shields (born 1946), American actor, singer, director, dancer, and choreographer